Abdelwaheb Sofiane Khedairia (born 1 April 1989) is a footballer who plays for Al-Shoulla. Born in France, he represented Algeria at international level.

Career
Khedairia began his career playing for two small amateur clubs, US Baille and Burel FC. In 2004, he joined the Toulouse FC academy and progressed his way up the ranks. On January 24, 2007, despite being just 17 years old, Khedairia was called up to the senior side for the first time and was on the bench for Toulouse in a Ligue 1 match against Nice. However, he did not play in the game.

International
Khedairia was called up to the senior Algeria squad for the 2017 Africa Cup of Nations qualifier against Lesotho in September 2015.

References

External links
 
 

1989 births
Living people
Sportspeople from Drôme
Sportspeople from Valence, Drôme
Footballers from Auvergne-Rhône-Alpes
French sportspeople of Algerian descent
Association football goalkeepers
Algerian footballers
French footballers
Algeria youth international footballers
Algeria under-23 international footballers
Toulouse FC players
Racing Besançon players
SO Cassis Carnoux players
Le Mans FC players
ES Sétif players
Al-Shoulla FC players
Ligue 2 players
Algerian Ligue Professionnelle 1 players
Saudi First Division League players
Algeria A' international footballers
Algerian expatriate footballers
Algerian expatriate sportspeople in Saudi Arabia
Expatriate footballers in Saudi Arabia